Tatoul Markarian (born April 1964) was appointed Armenian Ambassador to the United States on March 19, 2005, by President Robert Kocharian. He holds the diplomatic rank of Ambassador Extraordinary and Plenipotentiary. He also represents Armenia in the Organization of American States, where Armenia has a status of observer.

Biography 
Markarian was born on April 16, 1964, in Kapan, Armenia. He holds a master's degree in international relations from the School of Advanced International Studies at the Johns Hopkins University, and a PhD from the London School of Economics and Political Science. He graduated from the Yerevan University of National Economy in 1985, and completed a PhD in economics at the same university in 1989.

Prior to assuming this position, Ambassador Markarian served as Deputy Minister of Foreign Affairs of Armenia since June 2000. In that capacity, his responsibilities included the Ministry's Departments of Politico-Military Affairs; International Organizations; CIS Countries; and Asia-Pacific and Africa. He was also the Armenian coordinator for the U.S.-Armenia Strategic Dialogue as well as the NATO-Armenia Political-Military Dialogue. In 2002–2003, Ambassador Markarian was also special representative of the president of Armenia for Nagorno Karabakh negotiations. In 1999–2000, he served as advisor to the foreign minister.

Previous diplomatic assignments of Ambassador Tatoul Markarian included a term as deputy chief of mission and minister-counselor at the Armenian Embassy in Washington, D.C., from December 1994 to January 1999.

Before joining the Armenian Foreign Service, Ambassador Markarian served in newly independent Armenia's legislative and executive branches. He was assistant to the vice chairman of the Armenian Parliament from 1990 to 1991, and assistant and then adviser to the vice president of Armenia from 1991 to 1994, also serving as acting chief of staff to the prime minister of Armenia from 1991 to 1992.

Markarian also served as the Head of the Mission of Armenia to the European Union.

In addition to his native Armenian, Ambassador Markarian is fluent in English and Russian. He is married and has three sons.

External links
ԱՄՆ նախագահը բացառիկ է գնահատել դեսպան Թաթուլ Մարգարյանի գործունեությունը

1964 births
People from Kapan
Living people
Paul H. Nitze School of Advanced International Studies alumni
Alumni of the London School of Economics
Government ministers of Armenia
Ambassadors of Armenia to the United States
Ambassadors of Armenia to Mexico
Ambassadors of Armenia to Belgium